The Prix Bertrand de Tarragon is a Group 3 flat horse race in France open to thoroughbred fillies and mares aged three years or older. It is run over a distance of 1,800 metres (about 9 furlongs) at Longchamp in September. It was previously contested at Listed level and raised to Group 3 status from the 2016 running.

Winners since 2014

See also 
 List of French flat horse races

References 

Racing Post:

Middle distance horse races for fillies and mares
Longchamp Racecourse
Horse races in France